Thamnopora boloniensis is an extinct species of tabulate coral. Its name was Favosites boloniensis.

References

Tabulata
Fossil taxa described in 1877
Carboniferous animals of Asia